The Phantom of the Range is a 1936 American Western film directed by Robert F. Hill.

Cast 
Tom Tyler as Jerry Lane
Beth Marion as Jeanne Moore
Sammy Cohen as Eddie Parsons
Soledad Jiménez as Perdita, the Housekeeper
Forrest Taylor as Brandon
Charles King as Henchman Mark Braden
John Elliott as Rancher
Richard Cramer as Sheriff

External links 

1936 films
1930s English-language films
American black-and-white films
1936 Western (genre) films
American Western (genre) films
Films directed by Robert F. Hill
Films produced by Sam Katzman
Victory Pictures films
1930s American films